Monika Liubinaitė (born 9 February 1988), known professionally as Monika Liu, is a Lithuanian singer-songwriter. She represented Lithuania in the Eurovision Song Contest 2022 in Turin, Italy with the song "Sentimentai". She was announced as one of the qualifiers and took 14th place at the Grand Final.

Early life 
Liubinaitė was born in Klaipėda, in the family of a music teacher and a musician. She studied at Klaipėda Ąžuolynas Gymnasium, attended ballet lessons when she was little. As a student, Liubinaitė moved to Boston and later to London. As of 2022, Liubinaitė lives in Vilnius.

Career 
Liubinaitė began her musical career at the age of five when she started to play the violin. After graduating from high school, Liubinaitė studied jazz music and vocal studies at the Faculty of Music of Klaipėda University, and later went to the United States, where she studied at Berklee College of Music in Boston. After leaving the college, the singer moved to London, where continued to compose songs. She has worked with the famous producer Mario Basanov, collaborated with the electronic music family Silence, recorded the song "Ne Vakar" ("Not Yesterday") with the band Sel, and appeared on the LRT television project  ("Golden Voice").

Liubinaitė's early work has been described as a "strongly electro-pop (and less bizarre) version of Björk". On 23 May 2019, Liubinaitė was announced as a judge of The Voice Lithuania. She has also served as a jury member of The Masked Singer Lithuania during its 2021 season. On 20 April 2020, the artist released her second album and first vinyl record Melodija. The record was recorded in the United Kingdom in collaboration with producer Miles James, sound director Christoph Skirl and musician Marius Aleksa.

2022: Eurovision Song Contest 

The song was publicly released on 18 January 2022, and topped the Lithuanian singles chart shortly after. Liubinaitė performed in the third heat and advanced to the semi-finals and final, ultimately winning the competition, thereby winning the right to represent Lithuania in the Eurovision Song Contest 2022 in Turin, Italy.

"Sentimentai" participated in the first semi-final of Eurovision 2022, which took place on 10 May 2022, and ultimately qualified for the grand final, which took place on 14 May 2022, winning 14th place with 128 points.

Filmography
Aš matau tavo balsą (2022) — Celebrity panelist

Discography

Studio albums

Singles

As lead artist

As featured artist

References 

21st-century Lithuanian women singers
Eurovision Song Contest entrants for Lithuania
Eurovision Song Contest entrants of 2022
Lithuanian songwriters
1988 births
Living people
Klaipėda University alumni
Berklee College of Music alumni